Chisholm, Chisholme or Chisolm may refer to:

Places

Australia 
 Chisholm, Australian Capital Territory, Canberra
 Chisholm, New South Wales, a suburb of Maitland, New South Wales
 Division of Chisholm, an electoral district in the Australian House of Representatives in Victoria

Canada 
 Chisholm, Alberta
 Chisholm, Ontario

United States 
 Chisholm, Maine
 Chisholm, Minnesota
 Chisholm, Texas
 Chisholm Creek (Kansas), a stream in Kansas
 Chisholm Spring, Oklahoma
 Chisholm Trail, Texas

Saudi Arabia 
  (27°56'45.5"N 34°30'10.2"E), a cape of Tiran Island

Schools
 Caroline Chisholm School – Senior Campus, formerly Caroline Chisholm High School, in Australia
 Chisholm Institute, a Technical and Further Education (TAFE) Institute located throughout Victoria, Australia

People
 Chisholm (surname), includes Chisholme, Chisolm and Chisum
 Clan Chisholm, a Scottish clan

Other uses
 Chisholm v. Georgia, a 1793 case heard by the United States Supreme Court
 SS Clan Chisholm (1937), a British cargo ship
 Chisolm Massacre, 1877 killings in Mississippi

See also
 
 Chisom, a given name